Lucky Loser may refer to:
 Lucky loser, a sports competitor who loses a match, but who then re-enters the competition
 Lucky Loser (2006 film), a Thai sports-comedy film
 Lucky Loser (1934 film), a British comedy film

See also
 Lucky Losers, a 1950 comedy film starring The Bowery Boys